The election for Resident Commissioner to the United States House of Representatives took place on November 2,2004, the same day as the larger Puerto Rican general election and the United States elections, 2004.

Candidates for Resident Commissioner 
 Luis Fortuño for the New Progressive Party
 Edwin Irizarry Mora for the Puerto Rican Independence Party
 Roberto Prats Palerm for the Popular Democratic Party

Election results

See also 
 Puerto Rican general election, 2004

References 

2004 Puerto Rico elections
Puerto Rico
2004